The 1937 All-SEC football team consists of American football players selected to the All-Southeastern Conference (SEC) chosen by various selectors for the 1937 college football season. Alabama won the conference.

All-SEC selections

Ends
Bill Jordan, Georgia Tech (AP-1, UP-1)
Tut Warren, Alabama (AP-1, UP-2)
Perron Shoemaker, Alabama (AP-2, UP-1)
Ralph Wenzel, Tulane (AP-2)
Bob Kincade, Ole Miss (UP-2)
Bowden Wyatt, Tennessee (College Football Hall of Fame) (AP-3)
Ken Kavanaugh, LSU (College Football Hall of Fame) (AP-3)

Tackles
Frank Kinard, Ole Miss (College Football Hall of Fame) (AP-1, UP-1)
Eddie Gatto, LSU (AP-1, UP-2)
Bo Russell, Auburn (AP-2, UP-1)
Jim Ryba, Alabama  (AP-3, UP-2)
Baby Ray, Vanderbilt (AP-2)
Ben Friend, LSU (AP-3)

Guards
Leroy Monsky, Alabama (AP-1, UP-1)
Ralph Sivell, Auburn (AP-1, UP-1)
Ed Merlin, Vanderbilt (AP-2, UP-2)
Ed Sydnor, Kentucky (AP-2)
Norman Buckner, Tulane (UP-2)
Norman Hall, Tulane (AP-3)
Elijah Tinsley, Georgia (AP-3)

Centers
Carl Hinkle, Vanderbilt (College Football Hall of Fame) (AP-1, UP-1)
Quinton Lumpkin, Georgia (AP-2, UP-2)
Jack Chivington, Georgia Tech (AP-3)

Quarterbacks
Fletcher Sims, Georgia Tech (AP-1, UP-1)
George Cafego, Tennessee (College Football Hall of Fame) (AP-2)
Young Bussey, LSU (UP-2)
Lunny Hollins, Vanderbilt (AP-3)

Halfbacks
Joe Kilgrow, Alabama (AP-1, UP-1)
Walter Mayberry, Florida (AP-1, UP-1)
Charles Rohm, LSU (AP-2)
Bob Davis, Kentucky (AP-2, UP-2)
Bert Marshall, Vanderbilt (UP-2)
Jimmy Fenton, Auburn (AP-3)
Marlon "Dutch" Konemann, Georgia Tech (AP-3)

Fullbacks
Bill Hartman, Georgia (College Football Hall of Fame) (AP-1)
Jeff Milner, LSU (UP-1)
Charlie Holm, Alabama (AP-2, UP-2)
Guy Milner, LSU (AP-3)

Key

AP = Associated Press.

UP = United Press

Bold = Consensus first-team selection by both AP and UP

See also
1937 College Football All-America Team

References

All-SEC
All-SEC football teams